Rouf may refer to:

Rouf, Athens, a neighbourhood of Athens in Greece
Rouf F.C., a Greek football club
Abdur Rouf (judge), a Bangladeshi judge
Md Abdur Rouf, a Bangladeshi kabaddi player
Munshi Abdur Rouf, a recipient of the Bir Sreshtho military award

See also
Raouf
Rauf
Roof (disambiguation)